Percival Thomas Corbett (20 February 1900 – 26 June 1944) was an English cricketer who played seven first-class cricket matches for Worcestershire County Cricket Club in the early 1920s, but found little success with the county. He later played club cricket in Liverpool.

Corbett was born in Fernhill Heath, Worcestershire. He died at the age of 44 in West Malvern, also in Worcestershire.

References

External links
 

1900 births
1944 deaths
People from Wychavon (district)
English cricketers
Worcestershire cricketers
Sportspeople from Worcestershire